Prakash Seet (born 15 September 1991) is an Indian cricketer. He made his Twenty20 debut for Jharkhand in the 2012–13 Syed Mushtaq Ali Trophy on 18 March 2013.

References

External links
 

1991 births
Living people
Indian cricketers
Jharkhand cricketers
Cricketers from Jharkhand